
Linphone (contraction of Linux phone) is a free voice over IP softphone, SIP client and service. It may be used for audio and video direct calls and calls through any VoIP softswitch or IP-PBX. Linphone also provides the possibility to exchange instant messages. It has a simple multilanguage interface based on Qt for GUI and can also be run as a console-mode application on Linux.

The softphone is currently developed by Belledonne Communications in France. Linphone was initially developed for Linux but now supports many additional platforms including Microsoft Windows, macOS, and mobile phones running Windows Phone, iOS or Android. It supports ZRTP for end-to-end encrypted voice and video communication.

Linphone is licensed under the GNU GPL-3.0-or-later and supports IPv6. Linphone can also be used behind network address translator (NAT), meaning it can run behind home routers. It is compatible with telephony by using an Internet telephony service provider (ITSP).

Features 
Linphone hosts a free SIP service on its website.

The Linphone client provides access to following functionalities:

 Multi-account work
 Registration on any SIP-service and line status management
 Contact list with status of other users
 Conference call initiation
 Combination of message history and call details 
 DTMF signals sending (SIP INFO / RFC 2833)
 File sharing
 Additional plugins

Open standards support

Protocols 
 SIP according to RFC 3261 (UDP, TCP and TLS)
 SIP SIMPLE
 NAT traversal by TURN and ICE
 RTP/RTCP
 Media-security: SRTP and ZRTP

Audio codecs
Audio codec support: Speex (narrow band and wideband), G.711 (μ-law, A-law), GSM, Opus, and iLBC (through an optional plugin)

Video codecs
Video codec support: MPEG-4, Theora, VP8 and H.264 (with a plugin based on x264), with resolutions from QCIF (176×144) to SVGA (800×600) provided that network bandwidth and CPU power are sufficient.

Gallery

See also
Comparison of VoIP software
List of SIP software
Opportunistic encryption

References

External links

Cross-platform software
Android (operating system) software
Free and open-source Android software
Communication software
Free VoIP software
Instant messaging clients
Instant messaging clients for Linux
IOS software
MacOS instant messaging clients
Videotelephony
VoIP software
Windows instant messaging clients
BlackBerry software